The Gewane-Mille mine is a mine located in southern Ethiopia. It represents the largest bentonite reserve in the country, and has been estimated at 70 million tonnes.

See also
Dawa Okote mine

References

Bentonite mines in Ethiopia